This is the setup of the association football league system in United Arab Emirates (UAE).

The tables below show the makeup of the system. The UAE Pro League sits at the top of the pyramid and two teams get promoted/relegated between the UAEPL and Division 1. UAE Division 1 is the 2nd tier of the league system, while attempts to establish a third tier by splitting Division 1 into 2 groups has failed, around 2019, Division 2 was established to act as the new 3rd tier league, however it is uncertain how promotion and relegation will take place.

External links

 
United